Marc-Andrea Hüsler (born 24 June 1996) is a Swiss tennis player. He has a career-high ATP singles ranking of world No. 47, achieved on 13 February 2023. In doubles, he achieved a career-high ranking of world No. 132 on 25 October 2021. He is currently the No. 1 Swiss player.

Tennis career

2017: ATP debut and first ATP win in doubles 
Hüsler made his ATP main-draw doubles debut at the Swiss Indoors tournament, where he partnered former world No 1. Nenad Zimonjić, having received a wildcard into the tournament. The pair defeated Adrian Mannarino and Benoît Paire to give Hüsler a win in his first tour level match, before losing in the quarterfinals to Marcus Daniell and Dominic Inglot.

2018: First Challenger doubles title, ATP singles debut and first win  
Hüsler claimed his first ATP Challenger Tour doubles title in his first final, partnering Sem Verbeek at the Winnipeg Challenger.

Just over a week later, Hüsler made his ATP main draw singles debut at the Swiss Open Gstaad, where he recorded his first ATP win defeating former top-10 player Nicolás Almagro in a third-set tiebreaker in the first round, before losing to Facundo Bagnis in the second round. Hüsler received a wildcard into the doubles draw for the Swiss Indoors for the second consecutive year, this time with Verbeek as his partner. The pair upset Michael Venus and Raven Klaasen, the top seeds for the tournament and world No. 7 doubles partnership in the 2018 Doubles Team Race Rankings in the first round.

2019: First Challenger singles title & Top 300 debut
On April 21, 2019, Hüsler won his first Challenger title at the 2019 San Luis Open Challenger Tour by beating Adrian Menendez-Maceiras 7–5, 7–6 in the final. As a result, he moved 70 positions up into the top 300 on 22 April at world No. 281 in singles.

2020: Two Challengers titles, First ATP semifinal & Top 150 debut 
Hüsler reached the semifinals of the Austrian Open Kitzbühel, where he beat world No. 12 Fabio Fognini in the second round. As a result, he reached the top 150 at world No. 149 on 9 November 2020.

2021: Maiden ATP doubles title 
He won his maiden ATP doubles title at the 2021 Swiss Open Gstaad, partnering Dominic Stricker, defeating Polish pair Szymon Walków and Jan Zielinski.

In September, partnering also with Stricker, he reached the final of the 2021 Challenger Biel/Bienne, Switzerland but withdrew. As a result, he reached a month later a new career-high doubles ranking of World No. 132 on 25 October 2021. He also reached the final in singles, where he lost to Liam Broady but climbed to No. 155 on 18 October 2021. 

He finished the year ranked No. 188 in singles.

2022: Major & Masters & top 60 debut, Swiss No. 1, Maiden ATP singles title
In April he won two more Challenger titles in Mexico. As a result, he reached a career-high ranking of No. 121 on 9 May 2022.

In June, at the 2022 Halle Open he qualified for his first ATP 500 tournament but lost to Mackenzie McDonald. Hüsler made his Grand Slam debut after qualifying for Wimbledon, where he lost to lucky loser Hugo Grenier, who was also making his debut, in the first round in five sets.

At the 2022 Swedish Open he defeated seventh seed Holger Rune in the first round before losing to Laslo Djere. As a result, he reached the top 100 at World No. 99 on 18 July 2022. He became the Swiss No. 1 player until 8 August 2022.

At the 2022 Winston-Salem Open he reached only his second career quarterfinal as a qualifier after getting a second round bye after seventh seed Sebastian Baez withdrew, defeating previous year finalist and wildcard Mikael Ymer and defending champion and eleventh seed Ilya Ivashka. Next, he reached the semifinals for the second time ever in his career defeating thirteenth seed Jack Draper in straight sets. He was only the fourth qualifier to reach the tournament semifinals ever. He lost again to Laslo Đere in the semifinal. As a result, he reached a new career high ranking of No. 85 becoming again the Swiss No. 1 player on 29 August 2022.

At the 2022 Sofia Open he reached his first ATP final with a win over fourth seed Lorenzo Musetti. He defeated again fifth seed Holger Rune to win his maiden ATP title. As a result, he climbed 31 spots to a new career-high of No. 64 in the rankings on 3 October 2022.

He made his Masters 1000 debut at the 2022 Rolex Paris Masters after defeating Hugo Gaston and Laslo Djere in qualifying. On his debut, he defeated 11th seed Jannik Sinner in his first round match. He lost to Karen Khachanov in the second round. As a result he reached a career-high ranking of world No. 58 on 7 November 2022.

2023: Top 50 debut
He reached the top 50 at world No. 49 following the 2023 Australian Open on 6 February 2023.

Davis Cup 

Hüsler made his Davis Cup debut for Switzerland in the 2018 Davis Cup World Group tie with Kazakhstan, where he partnered Luca Margaroli in the doubles. The pair were defeated, coming back from two sets to love down, but losing the fifth set to Timur Khabibulin and Aleksandr Nedovyesov. Hüsler made his singles debut in the following rubber, which by this point was dead as Switzerland were already 3–0 down. Hüsler won in straight sets over Roman Khassanov, salvaging the only point for Switzerland in the tie. He opened up Switzerland's World Group Play-off tie against Sweden, losing from two sets to love up against Markus Eriksson, as Switzerland were relegated from the World Group.

Singles performance timeline

Current through the 2022 Australian Open.

ATP career finals

Singles: 1 (1 title)

Doubles: 1 (1 title)

ATP Challenger and ITF Futures finals

Singles: 9 (7–2)

Doubles: 22 (11–11)

Record against top 10 players
Hüsler's record against players who have been ranked in the top 10, with those who are active in boldface. Only ATP Tour main draw matches are considered:

References

External links

1996 births
Living people
Swiss male tennis players
Tennis players from Zürich